The age of criminal responsibility is the age below which a child is deemed incapable of having committed a criminal offence. In legal terms, it is referred to as a defence/defense of infancy, which is a form of defense known as an excuse so that defendants falling within the definition of an "infant" are excluded from criminal liability for their actions, if at the relevant time, they had not reached an age of criminal responsibility. After reaching the initial age, there may be levels of responsibility dictated by age and the type of offense committed.

Under the English common law the defense of infancy was expressed as a set of presumptions in a doctrine known as doli incapax. A child under the age of seven was presumed incapable of committing a crime. The presumption was conclusive, prohibiting the prosecution from offering evidence that the child had the capacity to appreciate the nature and wrongfulness of what they had done. Children aged 7–13 were presumed incapable of committing a crime but the presumption was rebuttable. The prosecution could overcome the presumption by proving that the child understood what they were doing and that it was wrong. In fact, capacity was a necessary element of the state's case (thus, the rule of sevens doctrine arose). If the state failed to offer sufficient evidence of capacity, the infant was entitled to have the charges dismissed at the close of the state's evidence. Doli incapax was abolished in England and Wales in 1998 for children over the age of 10, but persists in other common law jurisdictions.

Terminology
The terminology regarding such a defense varies by jurisdiction and sphere. "Defense of infancy" is a mainly US term. The "age of criminal responsibility" is used by most European countries, the UK,  Australia, New Zealand and other Commonwealth of Nations countries. Other instances of usage have included the terms age of accountability, age of responsibility, and age of liability,

The term minimum age of criminal responsibility (MACR) is a term commonly used in the literature.
 
The rationale behind the age of accountability laws are the same as those behind the insanity defense, insinuating both the mentally disabled and the young lack apprehension.

The age of criminal responsibility

Governments enact laws to label certain types of activity as wrongful or illegal. Behavior of a more antisocial nature can be stigmatized in a more positive way to show society's disapproval through the use of the word criminal. In this context, laws tend to use the phrase, "age of criminal responsibility" in two different ways:  
As a definition of the process for dealing with an alleged offender, the range of ages specifies the exemption of a child from the adult system of prosecution and punishment. Most jurisdictions develop special juvenile justice systems in parallel to the adult criminal justice system. Here, the hearings are essentially welfare-based and deal with children as in need of compulsory measures of treatment and/or care. Children are diverted into this system when they have committed what would have been an offense as an adult.
As the physical capacity of a child to commit a crime. Hence, children are deemed incapable of committing some sexual or other acts requiring abilities of a more mature quality.

Discussion

This is an aspect of the public policy of parens patriae. In the criminal law, each state will consider the nature of its own society and the available evidence of the age at which antisocial behaviors begins to manifest itself. Some societies will have qualities of indulgence toward the young and inexperienced, and will not wish them to be exposed to the criminal law system before all other avenues of response have been exhausted. Hence, some states have a policy of doli incapax (i.e. incapable of wrong) and exclude liability for all acts and omissions that would otherwise have been criminal after reaching a specified age. Hence, no matter what the child may have done, there cannot be a criminal prosecution. However, although no criminal liability is inferred, other aspects of law may be applied. For example, in Nordic countries, an offense by a person under 15 years of age is considered mostly a symptom of problems in child's development. This will cause the social authorities to take appropriate administrative measures to secure the development of the child. Such measures may range from counseling to placement at special care unit. Being non-judicial, the measures are not dependent on the severity of the offense committed but on the overall circumstances of the child.

The policy of treating minors as incapable of committing crimes does not necessarily reflect modern sensibilities. Thus, if the rationale of the excuse is that children below a certain age lack the capacity to form the mens rea of an offense, this may no longer be a sustainable argument. Indeed, given the different speeds at which people may develop both physically and intellectually, any form of explicit age limit may be arbitrary and irrational. Yet, the sense that children do not deserve to be exposed to criminal punishment in the same way as adults remains strong. Children have not had experience of life, nor do they have the same mental and intellectual capacities as adults. Hence, it might be considered unfair to treat young children in the same way as adults. 

In Scotland, the age of criminal responsibility was raised from 8 to 12 by the implementation of the Age of Criminal Responsibility (Scotland) Act 2019, which came into force on 31 March 2020.  In England and Wales and Northern Ireland, the age of responsibility is 10 years, and in the Netherlands and Canada the age of responsibility is 12 years. Sweden, Finland, and Norway all set the age at 15 years. In the United States the age varies between states, being as low as 6 years in North Carolina and as high as 12 years in California, Massachusetts, and Utah, at least for most crimes; 11 years is the minimum age for federal crimes.  

As the treaty parties of the Rome Statute of the International Criminal Court could not agree on a minimum age for criminal responsibility, they chose to solve the question procedurally and excluded the jurisdiction of the Court for persons under eighteen years.

Some jurisdictions do not have a set fixed minimum age, but leave discretion to prosecutors to argue or the judges to rule on whether the child or adolescent ("juvenile") defendant understood that what was being done was wrong. If the defendant did not understand the difference between right and wrong, it may not be considered appropriate to treat such a person as culpable. Alternatively, the lack of real fault in the offender can be recognized by rulings that avoid criminal sentences and/or address more practical matters of parental responsibility by adjusting the rights of parents to unsupervised custody, or by separate criminal proceedings against the parents for breach of their duties as parents.

By country
The following are the minimum ages at which people may be charged with a criminal offence in each country:

Juvenile courts
In some countries, a juvenile court is a court of special jurisdiction charged with adjudicating cases involving crimes committed by those who have not yet reached a specific age.  If convicted in a juvenile court, the offender is found "responsible" for their actions as opposed to "guilty" of a criminal offense. Sometimes, in some jurisdictions (such as the United States of America), a minor may be tried as an adult.

See also
Age of candidacy
Reasonable person
Youth
Youth rights
Youth suffrage

Notes

Footnotes

References

Further reading
Maher, Gerry. Age and Criminal Responsibility. 2005 Vol 2. Ohio State Journal of Criminal Law. 493 Wayback Machine
CRC Country Reports (1992–1996); Juvenile Justice and Juvenile Delinquency in Central and Eastern Europe, 1995; United Nations, Implementation of UN Mandates on Juvenile Justice in ESCAP, 1994; Geert Cappelaere, Children's Rights Centre, University of Gent, Belgium.

Age of criminal responsibility
Infancy, d
Juvenile justice system
Juvenile law